Olympiacos CFP Superleague Formula team is the racing team of Olympiacos CFP, a major Greek multi-sport club, based in Piraeus, Athens. The Olympiacos CFP racing team competes in the Superleague Formula. It has been operated by GU-Racing International in both seasons.

Record
(key)

2008

2009
Super Final results in 2009 did not count for points towards the main championship.

2010

 Chris van der Drift qualified for the Super Final at Brands Hatch but was unable to compete due to suffering injuries from a large crash in race two which led to him being taken to hospital with a broken ankle, two broken ribs, a cracked shoulder blade, a dislocated shoulder and two broken fingers. His Super Final place was taken up by the seventh highest points-scorer of the weekend, Yelmer Buurman.

References

External links
 Olympiacos CFP Superleague Formula team minisite
 Official Olympiacos CFP football club website

 
Formula
Superleague Formula club teams